The GCC U-17 Championship is an annual international football competition organised by the Gulf Cooperation Council. 2001 was the first edition of the tournament and was played in a round-robin group of five nations.

Records
The 2014 edition had been moved from Qatar to Bahrain, but was later cancelled in whole.

Performance by country

See also
 Arabian Gulf Cup

References

External links
 UAFA Official Website
 Gulf Cup Under 17

 
Union of Arab Football Associations competitions
Under-17 association football
Gulf Cooperation Council